Edose Ibadin (born 27 February 1993) is an American-Nigerian runner who specializes in the 800 metres.

He finished seventh at the 2018 African Championships. He competed at the 2017 World Championships, the 2019 African Games and the 2019 World Championships without reaching the final.

His personal best time is 1:44.81 minutes, achieved in an August 1 time trial in Alexandria, Virginia. This is the current Nigerian record.

He ran collegiately for the Hampton Pirates and then attended graduate school at Towson University from 2016 to 2018 while training with the District Track Club. Competing in the 2016 US Olympic trials as "unattached", he later changed allegiance to Nigeria.

References

1993 births
Living people
American people of Nigerian descent
Nigerian male middle-distance runners
Athletes (track and field) at the 2019 African Games
African Games competitors for Nigeria
World Athletics Championships athletes for Nigeria
Hampton Pirates and Lady Pirates
Hampton University alumni
Towson University alumni